Mario Maire (born 28 January 1935) is an Argentine rower. He competed in the men's coxed pair event at the 1960 Summer Olympics.

References

1935 births
Living people
Argentine male rowers
Olympic rowers of Argentina
Rowers at the 1960 Summer Olympics
Sportspeople from Rosario, Santa Fe
Pan American Games medalists in rowing
Pan American Games silver medalists for Argentina
Rowers at the 1959 Pan American Games